The Apostolic Nunciature to Naples was an ecclesiastical office of the Catholic Church in the Kingdom of Naples. It was a diplomatic post of the Holy See, whose representative is called the Apostolic Nuncio with the rank of an ambassador.

References

Naples
Apostolic Nuncios to the Kingdom of Naples